Nancy Atkinson,  (also known as Nancy Cook and Nancy Benko; 9 March 1910 – 21 December 1999) was an Australian bacteriologist. In the 1950s, she was recognised as one of the world's leading authorities on bacteriology, and led research on Salmonella bacteria, antibiotic and vaccine development, and the isolation of the poliovirus.

Early life and education
Atkinson was born in Melbourne, Australia. She began studying a Bachelor of Science at the University of Melbourne, majoring in chemistry but eventually switching to the relatively new field of bacteriology. She graduated with the bachelor's degree in 1931, and with a Master of Science in 1932, then worked as a research scholar and demonstrator at the university's Department of Bacteriology from 1932 to 1937.

Scientific career
In 1937, Atkinson transferred to the Government of South Australia's Laboratory of Pathology and Bacteriology in Adelaide. The next year, the laboratory was incorporated into the Institute of Medical and Veterinary Science as part of the University of Adelaide. Atkinson continued to work part-time at the institute, whilst also lecturing in bacteriology at the university. She was promoted to lecturer-in-charge in 1942, and reader-in-charge of bacteriology in 1952, whereupon she joined the university full-time.

Atkinson's early work at the IMVS involved the development, production and administration of the BCG vaccine in Australia to combat tuberculosis, as encouraged by Darcy Cowan. Atkinson and her team at the institute were responsible for manufacturing the first batch of penicillin in Australia, after eighteen months of work produced enough of the antibiotic to cover a threepenny piece in 1943. She also regularly put out calls for samples of Australian flora such as the Geraldton wax and native fungi, which were then analysed to determine if they could be used to develop new anti-bacterial substances. In 1943, Atkinson developed penicidin, an antibiotic which was proposed to be used as an alterative to penicillin, however the drug was reclassified in the 1960s as a mycotoxin.

Atkinson specialised in the study of Salmonella bacteria. She established and ran the Salmonella Reference Laboratory (later the Australian Salmonella Reference Centre, a national reference laboratory), and published extensively on the subject. In 1943, she discovered a new strain of the bacteria, which she named S. adelaide after South Australia's capital city.

Honours
At the New Years Honours 1951, Atkinson was made an Officer of the Order of the British Empire.

In 1957, the University of Adelaide awarded Atkinson with a Doctor of Science (DSc) degree for her work on antibiotics and salmonellas.

Personal life
Atkinson's first marriage was to Irving M. Cook, the manager of British Empire Films in South Australia. They had a son, Jonathan, born in April 1948.

Her second marriage was to architect Andrew Benko, with whom she founded and ran the Chalk Hill winery in the McLaren Vale region. Under her married name, Nancy Benko, she wrote two books on Australian art—Art and Artists of South Australia and The Art of David Boyd—as well as a biography of Gustave Barnes for the Australian Dictionary of Biography.

References

1910 births
1999 deaths
Australian bacteriologists
Australian women scientists
University of Melbourne alumni
Academic staff of the University of Melbourne
University of Melbourne women
Academic staff of the University of Adelaide
Australian Officers of the Order of the British Empire